Alfonso de la Mota y Escobar (18 May 1546 – 16 March 1625) was a Roman Catholic prelate who served as Bishop of Tlaxcala (Puebla de los Angeles) (1607–1625),
Bishop of Guadalajara (1598–1607), and Bishop Elect of Nicaragua (1594–1595).

Biography
Alfonso de la Mota y Escobar was born in México on 18 May 1546.
On 31 March 1594, he was appointed during the papacy of Pope Clement VIII as Bishop of Nicaragua but resigned in 1595. 
On 11 March 1598, he was appointed during the papacy of Pope Clement VIII as Bishop of Guadalajara.
In June 1599, he was consecrated bishop 
On 11 March 1598, he was appointed during the papacy of Pope Clement VIII as Bishop of Tlaxcala (Puebla de los Angeles). 
He served as Bishop of Tlaxcala (Puebla de los Angeles) until his death on 16 March 1625.

While bishop, he was the principal consecrator of Juan de Cervantes (bishop), Bishop of Antequera, Oaxaca (1609), and Juan de Zapata y Sandoval, Bishop of Chiapas (1613).

References

External links and additional sources
 (for Chronology of Bishops)) 
 (for Chronology of Bishops) 
 (for Chronology of Bishops) 
 (for Chronology of Bishops) 
 (for Chronology of Bishops) 
 (for Chronology of Bishops) 

16th-century Roman Catholic bishops in Nicaragua
16th-century Roman Catholic bishops in Mexico
Bishops appointed by Pope Clement VIII
1546 births
1625 deaths
17th-century Roman Catholic bishops in Mexico
Roman Catholic bishops of León in Nicaragua